Beauty and the Breakdown is an album by metalcore band Bury Your Dead. The album was released on July 11, 2006, on Victory Records. The artwork is akin to a storybook and the song titles are from fairy tales.

Much like the group's second album, Cover Your Tracks, this album has a theme to its song titles. All songs titles are inspired by children's tales, similar to the songs on Cover Your Tracks, which are all Tom Cruise movie titles. The album is based on a woman and her abuser, as evidenced in the booklet that comes with the album.

The album sold 7,039 copies in its first week of release entering the Billboard 200 at number 129.

Track listing

Personnel
Bury Your Dead
Mat Bruso - vocals
Brendan "Slim" MacDonald - guitar
Eric Ellis - guitar
Mark Castillo - drums
Aaron Patrick - bass
Production
Jason Suecof - Producer, Engineer, Mixing
Dave Quiggle - artwork

References

2006 albums
Bury Your Dead albums
Victory Records albums
Albums produced by Jason Suecof
Nu metalcore albums